Yves Oscar Fortier, OC, FRSC (August 17, 1914 – August 19, 2014) was a Canadian geologist. He was the director of the Geological Survey of Canada from 1964 to 1973. He led expeditions to the Canadian Arctic in the 1950s and 1960s which identified significant potential oil and gas resources. He died at the age of 100 on August 19, 2014.

Honours

1953 - Fellow of the Royal Society of Canada
1964 - Massey Medal, Royal Canadian Geographical Society
1974 - Logan Medal, Geological Association of Canada
1980 - Officer of the Order of Canada
The mineral Yofortierite was named in his honor by Canadian geologist Guy Perrault, F.R.S. (1927–2002).
The Yves Fortier Earth Science Journalism Award is also named in his honor.

References

Science.ca - Yves Fortier
Royal Society of Canada - Yves Fortier

1914 births
2014 deaths
Officers of the Order of Canada
Fellows of the Royal Society of Canada
Canadian centenarians
Men centenarians
Canadian geologists
Canadian explorers
Canadian geophysicists
Geological Survey of Canada personnel
Massey Medal recipients
Logan Medal recipients
Université Laval alumni